is a Japanese film and television actor. Matsuda's best known film roles include the young and desirable samurai Sōzaburō Kanō in Taboo and the rock star Ren Honjo in Nana.

Early life
Matsuda was born on 9 May 1983 in Tokyo, to Yūsaku Matsuda, a Japanese actor of partial Korean ancestry, and Miyuki Matsuda (née Kumagai), a Japanese actress. He has two younger siblings, a younger brother, Shota Matsuda, and a younger sister by his parents' marriage and one older half-sister by his father's first marriage. His father died from bladder cancer in 1989, when Ryuhei was six years old. He attended Horikoshi High School, a Japanese high school that caters to celebrity students, but did not graduate.

Career
At age 15, Matsuda was offered the role of the desirable young samurai Kanō Sōzaburō in Nagisa Ōshima's 1999 film Taboo. The role helped boost him from an entirely unknown actor to a film star, earning him a Japanese Academy award "Newcomer of the Year", as well as "Blue Ribbon", "Kinema Junpo", and "Yokohama Film Festival" Awards for the "Best New Actor".

Since appearing in Taboo, Matsuda has played a wide range of roles, from the high school student Kujo in the 2001 film Blue Spring to the rock star Ren Honjo in the 2005 film Nana. In February 2013, it was revealed that Matsuda would play the part of a Japanese gangster in the sequel to the 2012 Indonesian film The Raid, named Berandal.

In 2020 portrayed Ryūnosuke Akutagawa in the film A Stranger in Shanghai. It depicts Akutagawa's time in as a reporter in the city.

Personal life
On 11 January 2009, Matsuda married , a Russian-Japanese model. Their first child, a girl, was born on 4 July 2009. They divorced in December 2017.

On 20 October 2021, Matsuda married , a British-Japanese model.

Filmography

Films 

 Taboo (Gohatto) (1999)
 Shibito no Koiwazurai (2001)
 Hashire! Ichiro (2001)
 Blue Spring (2002)
 Collage of Our Life (Renai Shashin) (2003)
 17 Sai (2003)
 9 Souls as Michiru (2003)
 Hachigatsu no Kariyushi (2003)
 Showa Kayo Daizenshu (2003)
 Cutie Honey (2004)
 Izo (2004)
 Otakus in Love (2004)
 Yasha no Ike (2004)
 Nana (2005)
 Gimmy Heaven (2005)
 Rampo Noir (2005)
 Big Bang Love, Juvenile A (2006)
 Nightmare Detective (2006)
 Chosyu Five (2006)
 Sekai ha Tokidoki Utsukushii (2007)
 Purukogi (2007)
 Koisuru Madori (2007)
 Ahiru to Kamo no Koinrokkâ (2007)
 Densen Uta (2007)
 Nobody to Watch Over Me (2008)
 Nightmare Detective 2 (2008)
 Mt. Tsurugidake (2009)
 The Cannery Ship (Kanikosen) (2009)
 Hagetaka: The Movie (The Vulture) (2009)
 Boys on the Run (2010)
 Phone Call to the Bar (2011), Takada
 Tada's Do-It-All House (2011)
 The Great Passage (2013)
 Mugiko-san to (2013)
 Detective in the Bar (2013), Takada
 The Raid 2 (2014)
 Jinuyo Saraba: Kamuroba Mura e (2015)
 The Magnificent Nine (2016)
 My Uncle (2016)
 The Tokyo Night Sky Is Always the Densest Shade of Blue (2017)
 Before We Vanish (2017)
 The Last Shot in the Bar (2017), Takada
 The Scythian Lamb (2018)
 Isle of Dogs (2018) (German-American film)
 The Miracle of Crybaby Shottan (2018), Shōji Segawa
 Noroshi ga Yobu (2019) 
 Beneath the Shadow (2020)
 Hakai no Hi (2020)
 Zokki (2021)
 Who Were We? (2023)
 Transcending Dimensions (2024)

TV dramas 
 San Oku-Yen Jiken (2000) - Roku
 Hagetaka (2007) - Osamu Nishino
 Ashita no Kita Yoshio (2008) - Heita Yashiro
 Tenchijin (2009) - Date Masamune
 Mahoro Ekimae Bangaichi (2013) - Haruhiko Gyōten
 Amachan (2013) - Takuma Mizuguchi
 Quartet (2017) - Tsukasa Beppu
 Kurara: Hokusai no Musume (2017) - Zenjirō
 Kemono ni Narenai Watashitachi (2018) - Kosei Nemoto
 Smoking (2018) - Masayuki Sakakibara
 Yuganda Hamon (2019) - Masahiko Sawamura
 Idaten (2019) - Kenzō Tange
 A Stranger in Shanghai (2019) - Ryūnosuke Akutagawa
 Okehazama (2021) - Shibata Katsuie
 My Dear Exes (2021) - Hassaku Tanaka
 Uzukawamura Jiken (2022) - Iwamori

Awards
Matsuda won a Japanese Academy Award for the "Best Supporting Actor" in the 2011 film Tantei wa Bar ni Iru, and Nikkan Sports Film Award for the "Best Actor" in the 2013 film The Great Passage.

References

External links
 
 

1983 births
Living people
Japanese male actors of Korean descent
Japanese people of Korean descent
Japanese male film actors
Japanese male television actors
Male actors from Tokyo
Horikoshi High School alumni
20th-century Japanese male actors
21st-century Japanese male actors